Mount Aetna is a census-designated place in Tulpehocken Township, Berks County, Pennsylvania, United States.  It is located along Pennsylvania Route 501 near the border of Lebanon County.  The community is named after the active volcano, Mount Etna, in Sicily.  As of the 2010 census, the population was 354 residents.

Demographics

References

See also

Census-designated places in Berks County, Pennsylvania
Census-designated places in Pennsylvania